The Singing Kettle News is a BAFTA award-winning children's series that run on CITV. The show starred The Singing Kettle, a children's group who are well known for performing traditional children's songs with a distinctly Scottish flair.

About the series
In total, four series were created comprising 37 x 10 min episodes. The aim of the show was to meet the deadline set by 'Mr Editor' and create front-page news. The Singing Kettle had to find lead stories for 'kettle News' by singing songs and telling stories.  Each episode contained Two songs, from series Two onwards, The audience of children could be seen unlike the first series where they were just heard. In series One, the famous rhyme was used at the end shortly before the closing credits in each episode, to retrieve the newspapers that had been put together that episode. In series Two, the opening theme was shortened and the rhyme was re-introduced at the start, panning across the audience. A stage was also introduced for the Singing Kettle to perform on. The tag-line 'Let's Sing all about it' was also introduced and used at the end of each episode before running on to the stage to sing.

From Series Three the series title was shortened to just The Singing Kettle, with new music and theme that included a shortened version of the Kettle's signature song 'What's Inside The Singing Kettle' concluding with the famous rhyme. The opening titles panned across the audience onto the stage where the team were then introduced. Cilla, Artie and Jane then sung an  extended edition of the famous rhyme while Gary played.

Episodes 

Series One contained 6 Episodes – 1996
Series Two Contained 5 Episodes – 1997
Series Three Contained 13 Episodes – 1998
Series Four Contained 13 Episodes – 2000

In 2016, the series produced for Scottish Television began airing on STV Glasgow and STV Edinburgh as part of their 'Wean's World' children's programming strand.

Video Tapes
 The Singing Kettle
 Sing All About It
 Daly News
 The Best Of The Singing Kettle

See also
 Music of Scotland

References

External links
The Singing Kettle's official web site
An article about the group at folkmusic.net
Smithsonian Folkways

1995 Scottish television series debuts
2000 Scottish television series endings
1990s Scottish television series
2000s Scottish television series
1990s British children's television series
2000s British children's television series
ITV children's television shows
British children's musical television series
Television shows produced by Scottish Television
Television series by ITV Studios
English-language television shows